Daphnella semivaricosa is a species of sea snail, a marine gastropod mollusk in the family Raphitomidae.

Description

Distribution
This marine species occurs in the China Seas and off Japan.

References

 Hasegawa, K., Okutani, T. and E. Tsuchida (2000) Family Turridae.In: Okutani, T. (ed.), Marine Mollusks in Japan. Tokai University Press, Tokyo, 619-667 (in Japanese).
 Liu J.Y. [Ruiyu] (ed.). (2008). Checklist of marine biota of China seas. China Science Press. 1267 pp

External links
 
 Gastropods.com: Daphnella (Daphnella) semivaricosa

semivaricosa
Gastropods described in 1990